Orem's Delight is a historic home at Bellevue, Talbot County, Maryland, United States.  The house, which was built about 1725, is a 20-by-25-foot, -story brick structure with an interior chimney.  It is one of the few small 18th-century structures to have survived without incorporation into a larger dwelling.

Orem's Delight was listed on the National Register of Historic Places in 1978.

References

External links
, including photo from 1976, at Maryland Historical Trust

Houses in Talbot County, Maryland
Houses on the National Register of Historic Places in Maryland
Houses completed in 1725
1725 establishments in Maryland
National Register of Historic Places in Talbot County, Maryland